Montmorin may refer to the following people and places.

People
 Armand Marc, comte de Montmorin, French minister of foreign affairs and the navy under Louis XVI.

Places
 Montmorin, Hautes-Alpes, a commune in the department of Hautes-Alpes
 Montmorin, Puy-de-Dôme, a commune in the department of Puy-de-Dôme